Houthem can be:
 Houthem, Wallonia, a district of the municipality of Comines-Warneton, Belgium
 Houthem, Netherlands, a village in the Netherlands
  (on the 1770s Ferraris maps spelled Houthem)